Votomita is a genus of flowering plants belonging to the family Melastomataceae.

Its native range is Cuba, Panama to Southern Tropical America.

Species:
 Votomita cupuliformis Morley & Almeda 
 Votomita guianensis Aubl.

References

Melastomataceae
Melastomataceae genera